The Former Residence of the Weng Clan (also called Former Residence of Weng Xincun) is located on the Weng Lane, Changshu, Jiangsu Province, China. It is a typical example of the gentry maisons in the regions south of the Yangtze River. The house was listed as a municipal cultural relics protection unit in 1982 with the name "the Former Residence of Wen Xincun". Its main hall, called "Caiyi Hall", was listed into the fourth group of National Key Cultural Relics Protection Units in 2001 and is now open to the public as the Memorial of Weng Tonghe.

Original building
The residence dates from the Ming dynasty and originally belonged to the Sang Clan. It became Yan Cheng's property during the Longqing era (1567–1572) and underwent several changes of ownership afterwards. In the 13th year of the Daoguang era (1833) of the Qing dynasty, Weng Xincun bought the mansion from the Zhong family, and his son Weng Tonghe grew up here. It occupies a total area of 6,000 m2, and the gross building area is about 3,000 m2.

Caiyi Hall

Built in the late Ming dynasty and occupying an area of 235 m2, the Caiyi Hall is the third hall along the central axis of the whole residence. Serving as the main hall, it was first called "Sengui" and was renamed as "Conggui" " afterwards. When Weng Xincun rebuilt it, he changed its name to "Caiyi Hall". This name is taken from the story of Old Laizi and it carries the meaning that children should try to make their parents laugh by any means possible. The hall is 3 bays wide and features a "yingshan" (firm-mountain-sloped) roof with nine rafters and "five purlins cross-beam". On either side of the hall stands a room and a roofed walkway connects it with other halls at its back. The traditional decorative colorings painted on the pillars are of high artistic value and they are considered masterpieces of the Suzhou style decorative paintings.

References

Further reading

External links
国家文物局全国重点文物保护单位名单(第1-6批)
中国网——"全国重点文物保护单位"专题

Buildings and structures in Suzhou
Ming dynasty architecture
Museums in Suzhou
Biographical museums in China
Traditional folk houses in Jiangsu
Major National Historical and Cultural Sites in Jiangsu